Aati Rahengi Baharein is an Indian television drama series that aired on Zee TV channel on 9 September 2002 and aired every Sunday to Wednesdays 8:30pm. The story focused on the concept of unselfish friendship and emotional bonding between friends who are from different social backgrounds.

Concept
The story revolves around the life of Dr. Amar Sanghani, who is the son of a businessman who owns a garment shop. While the father is proud of his son's achievements, the mother influenced by her brother feels that a businessman's son should become a businessman uncaring for her son's prestigious degree. Besides focusing on Amar, the series also about Amar's two best friends', Paddy and Milind, with whom he shares a close bond since childhood despite them belonging to different stratas of society. Amar's life takes an unfortunate turn when he finds out that he is suffering from a deadly disease which is incurable. Amar then takes a decision and cutting out everyone he cares and love from his life, so when he leaves no one would miss him.

Cast
 Dilip Thadeshwar as Dr. Amar Sanghani
 Pooja Ghai Rawal as Rashmi, Amar's love interest
 Sushmita Daan as Madhu, Amar's childhood friend and one-sided lover
 Nikita Thukral as Aarti, Amar's younger sister 
 Muni Jha as Chandulal Sanghani, Amar's father
 Ragini Shah as Kokila Sanghani, Amar's mother
 Randeep Shekhawat as Milind
 Rajeev Paul as Paddy
 Jaya Mathur as Anjali , Amar's elder sister
 Yatin Karyekar as Dr. Sahni

References

External links
Aati Rehengi Baharein New Article on Essel Groups

Zee TV original programming
Indian television soap operas
2002 Indian television series debuts
2003 Indian television series endings